Masao Inoue may refer to:

, Japanese actor and film director
, Japanese professional wrestler